Harpactorini is a tribe of the Harpactorinae (assassin bugs). This group is the most diverse of the entire assassin bug family, with 51 genera recognized in the Neotropical Region and 289 genera and 2003 species overall.

This tribe contains the only genera of the reduviidae with exaggerated modifications of the pronotum, such as the wheel bug (Arilus) and the strongly raised and divided posterior pronotal lobe in Ulpius Stål, 1865.

Genera

 Abelamocoris 
 Acanthischium 
 Acholla Stål, 1862
 Arilus Hahn, 1831
 Atopozelus 
 Atrachelus Amyot and Serville, 1843
 Coilopus 
 Cosmoclopius 
 Castolus Stål, 1858
 Camptibia Cai, 2003
 Coranus Curtis, 1833
 Dalytra Stål, 1861
 Doldina Stål, 1859
 Euagoras Burmeister, 1835
 Eulyes  Amyot & Serville, 1843
 Fitchia Stål, 1859
 Harpactor Laporte, 1833
 Harpactorella - monotypic Harpactorella frederici Wygodzinsky, 1946
 Heza Amyot and Serville, 1843
 Irantha Stål, 1861
 Liangcoris Zhao, Cai & Ren, 2007
 Lopodytes Stål, 1853
 Nagusta Stål, 1859
 Notocyrtus 
 Orbella 
 Pahabengkakia Miller, 1941
 Ploeogaster 
 Polymazus 
 Pristhesancus 
 Protenthocoris 
 Pselliopus Bergroth, 1905
 Repipta Stål, 1859
 Rhynocoris Hahn, 1834
 Rhinocoroides 
 Ricolla 
 Rocconota Stål, 1859
 Sinea Amyot and Serville, 1843
 Sphedanolestes Stål
 Sycanus Amyot and Serville, 1843
 Tunes 
 Ulpius 
 Undiareduvius  
 Vachiria 
 Vadimon 
 Varelia 
 Vatinius 
 Veledella 
 Velinus 
 Vesbius 
 Vestula 
 Vesulus 
 Villanovanus 
 Villiersiana 
 Vitumnus 
 Xystonyttus 
 Yolinus 
 Zamolxis 
 Zavattariocoris 
 Zelus Fabricius, 1802
 Zostus Stål, 1874

Other genera
Aga - Agrioclopius - Agriolestes - Agriosphodrus - Agyrius - Alcmenoides - Ambastus - Amphibolus - Analanca - Anyttus - Aphonocoris - Aprepolestes - Arcesius - Aristathlus - Astinus - Aulacoclopius - Aulacosphodrus - Australcnema - Austrarcesius - Austrovelinus - Authenta - Baliemocoris - Bequaertidea - Bergrothellus - Bettotanocoris - Bewanicoris - Biasticus - Blapton - Bocatella - Brassivola - Breddinia - Bubiacoris - Bukacoris - Butuanocoris - Callanocoris - Callilestes - Callistodema - Campsolomus - Camptibia - Campylorhyncha - Carmenula - Catasphactes - Cerellius - Chaetacantha - Chondrolophus - Cidoria - Coliniella - Colpochilocoris - Coniophyrta - Coranopsis - Corcia - Corhinoris - Cosmolestes - Cosmosycanus - Cydnocoris - Debilia - Diarthrotarsus - Dinocleptes - Domnus - Dumbia - Ecelenodalus - Elemacoris - Elongicoris - Endochiella - Endochopsis - Endochus - Epidaucus - Epidaus - Erbessus - Euagoropsis - Eurocconota - Eurosomocoris - Floresocoris - Gattonocoris - Gminatellus - Gminatus - Gonteosphodrus - Gorareduvius - Graptocleptes - Graptoclopius - Graptolestes - Haematochares - Hagia - Hagiana - Haplolestes - Harpagocoris - Harrisocoris - Havinthus - Hediocoris - Helonotus - Heterocorideus - Hiranetis - Hoffmannocoris - Homalosphodrus - Hoplomargasus - Hoplopium - IgoraIocoris - Iquitozelus - Iranthoides - Ischnoclopius - Ischnolestes - Isocondylus - Isyndus - Ixopus - Jeanneliella - Kalabitocoris - Kalonotocoris - Kaniama - Keiserocoris - Kibatia - Kibonotocoris - Komodocoris - Lamottellus - Lamprosphodrus - Lanca - Leptolestes - Lerton - Lestonicoris - Lindus - Lingnania - Lissocleptes - Loboplusius - Lophocephala - Luja - Macracanthopsis - Mafulucoris - Makilingana - Maldonadocoris - Mametocoris - Margasus - Marjoriana - Massartia - Mastigonomus - Mastocoris - Mastostethocoris - Mecistocoris - Microcarenus - Mireella - Mireicoris - Mokoto - Montina - Moto - Motoperius - Mucrolicter - Myocoris - Nacorus - Nacurosana - Nagustoides - Nannotegea - Nanyukicoris - Narsetes - Neoarcesius - Neobiasticus - Neocydnocoris - Neohavinthus - Neonagusta - Neosphedanolestes - Neotropiconyttus - Neoveledella - Neovelinus - Neovillanovanus - Nesocastolus - Nicrus - Nothocleptes - Occamus - Odontogonus - Oedemanota - Palawanocoris - Paloptus - Paniaia - Panthous - Pantoleistes - Paracydnocoris - Parahiranetis - Paralcnema - Paramphibolus - Parapanthous - Parapeprius - Parasclomina - Paravadimon - Parendochus - Pareulyes - Parharpagocoris - Parhelonotus - Parirantha - Peprius - Perissorhynchus - Peyrierocoris - Pharagocoris - Phemius - Phonoctonus - Phonolibes - Piestolestes - Pirnonota - Pisilus - Platerus - Poecilobdallus - Poeciloclopius - Poecilosphodrus - Polididus - Pseudolopodes - Pseudolopodytes - Pseudophonoctonus - Pyrrhosphodrus - Rhapactor - Rhaphidosoma - Rhinocoroides  - Rihirbus - Sava - Saxitius - Scipinia - Sclomina - Scoloponotus - Serendiba - Serendibana - Serendus - Siamocoris - Sindala - Sosius - Sphodronyttus - Stachyomerus - Stalireduvius - Stehlikia - Tegea - Tegellula - Testusius - Thereutocoris - Thysanuchus - Tivanius - Toxocamptellus - Trachylestes - Vibertiola

References

External links

Reduviidae
Hemiptera tribes